The 2016 WTA Elite Trophy was a women's tennis tournament played at the Hengqin International Tennis Center in Zhuhai, China from 1 to 6 November 2016. It was the second edition of the singles event and doubles competition. The tournament was contested by twelve singles players and six doubles teams.

Tournament

Qualifying
WTA Elite Trophy is an invitation-only event.

Singles qualifying
The field will consist of the top eleven players not already qualified for the 2016 WTA Finals, plus either (a) the 12th-player not qualified for 2016 WTA Finals, or (b) a wild card. The final two alternates for the 2016 WTA Finals would have been eligible to play in WTA Elite Trophy even if they had participated in the WTA Finals. Johanna Konta was initially qualified for the Tour Finals, but her spot was lost to Svetlana Kuznetsova who had just won Moscow on the day before the finals.

Doubles qualifying
Two teams composed of players that did not compete in the WTA Finals singles (except Finals Alternates) or doubles competitions, using the players’ combined doubles rankings as of the Monday after the final regular-season Tournament of the current Tour Year to determine the order of acceptance; and up to two teams composed of players that did not compete in the WTA Finals singles (except Finals Alternates) or doubles competitions and that include at least one Elite Trophy Singles Qualified Player or Elite Trophy Alternate, using the higher of the players’ combined singles or doubles rankings as of the Monday after the final regular-season Tournament of the current Tour Year to determine the order of acceptance.
Plus two wild cards. For each wild card not given out, the next highest pair of players shall become a participant.

It was unclear how the selection was determined eventually as two teams were announced as participants despite not fulfilling these criteria.

Format
The singles event features twelve players in a round robin event, split into four groups of three. Over the first four days of competition, each player meets the other two players in her group, with the winner in each group advancing to the semifinal. The winners of each semifinal meet in the championship match. The six doubles teams will be split into two round robin groups, with the winner of each advancing to the final.

Round robin tie-breaking methods
The final standings of each group were determined by the first of the following methods that applied:
 Greatest number of wins.
 Greatest number of matches played.
 Head-to-head results
 In case of a 3-way tie:
Percentage of sets won
Percentage of games won

Prize money and points
The total prize money for the Huajin Securities 2016 WTA Elite Trophy Zhuhai was US $2,210,000.

1 RR means prize money or points won in the round robin.
2 The wildcard entry will earn 80 points per win and 0 points per loss in the round robin.

Player head-to-head
Below are the head-to-head records as they approached the tournament.

Qualified players
The 2 tables below are part of the tables from Road to Singapore

Singles
Players in Gold have qualified for Zhuhai. Players in brown have withdrawn from the 2016 WTA Elite Trophy.

Other entrants
The following player received a wildcard into the singles draw:
  Zhang Shuai

Doubles

 1 Rankings as of 24 October 2016

Other entrants
The following pairs received wildcards into the doubles draw:
  Liang Chen /  Wang Yafan
  Yang Zhaoxuan /  You Xiaodi

Champions

Singles

  Petra Kvitová def.  Elina Svitolina, 6–4, 6–2

Doubles

  İpek Soylu /  Xu Yifan def.  Yang Zhaoxuan /  You Xiaodi, 6–4, 3–6, [10–7]

References

External links
 Official website
 Order of Play

2016
WTA Elite Trophy
WTA Elite Trophy
WTA Elite Trophy